George F. Green may refer to:

 George F. Green (dentist) (fl. 1863), American inventor of a dental drill
 G. F. Green (George Frederick Green, 1911–1977), British fiction writer
 George F. Green (fl. 1949), British creator of an edition of The International Jew
 George Green (trade unionist) (1908-1989), British trade unionist
 George Green (footballer born 1914) (1914–1995), British footballer

See also
George Green (disambiguation)